Carman Collegiate, founded in 1964, is the main secondary school in the town of Carman, Manitoba. It consists of approximately 300 students from grades 7 to 12. The current principal is Jeff Latimer and the vice principal is Mary Reimer. The school is a part of Prairie Rose School Division. The name for all school sports is the Carman Cougars.

References

External links 
 

High schools in Manitoba
Educational institutions established in 1964
1964 establishments in Manitoba